Leonard Emanuel May (18 April 1899 – 31 July 1959) was an Australian rules footballer who played with Fitzroy and St Kilda in the Victorian Football League (VFL).

Notes

External links 

1899 births
1959 deaths
Australian rules footballers from Victoria (Australia)
Australian Rules footballers: place kick exponents
Fitzroy Football Club players
St Kilda Football Club players